The Man in the Sea Museum is located at 17314 Panama City Beach Parkway, Panama City Beach, Florida. It has exhibits and documents related to the history of diving.

Footnotes

See also
List of maritime museums in the United States

External links

Websites
 Man in the Sea Museum - official site

Museums in Bay County, Florida
Sports museums in Florida
Maritime museums in Florida